Trinity is an album by jazz pianist Tommy Flanagan. It is a 1976 trio recording, with bassist Ron Carter and drummer Roy Haynes, that was also released as Positive Intensity.

Background and recording
This album was Flanagan's second as a leader in 15 years, having been vocalist Ella Fitzgerald's pianist for a long period. It was recorded in New York City on October 4, 18, and November 10, 1976.

Releases
Trinity was released by Inner City Records. The same material was also released by CBS/Sony as Positive Intensity.

Track listing
All compositions by Tommy Flanagan except as indicated
 "52nd Street Theme" (Thelonious Monk) - 3:17
 "Smooth As the Wind" (Tadd Dameron) - 5:43
 "Passion Flower" (Billy Strayhorn) - 4:17
 "Muffin" - 5:43
 "Verdande" - 2:47
 "Ruby, My Dear" (Monk) - 3:52
 "Bess, You Is My Woman Now" (George Gershwin) - 6:00
 "Hustle Bustle" - 3:19
 "Torment" - 3:38

Personnel
Tommy Flanagan – piano
Ron Carter – bass
Roy Haynes – drums

References

1976 albums
Tommy Flanagan albums
Albums produced by Teo Macero